Gårda Business Center, also known as the Canon building, is a high-rise office building in the Gårda district in Gothenburg. The 17-floor, 59 meters (195 feet) high building was completed in 1989. The building is the 28th tallest building in Sweden.

Buildings and structures in Gothenburg
Towers in Sweden
Skyscraper office buildings in Sweden